Bull Lake is a lake in geographic Boon Township in Algoma District, Ontario, Canada. The primary outflow is an unnamed creek to Little Bull Lake, which flows into Burnett Lake and then via Low Creek into the West River aux Sables, a tributary of the River aux Sables.

Highway 553 travels from Massey to Bull Lake, and Highway 810 continues from that point further north to Richie Falls.

See also
List of lakes in Ontario

References

Lakes of Algoma District